The 1989 Norwegian Football Cup Final was the 84th final of the Norwegian Football Cup. The final took place at Ullevaal Stadion in Oslo on 22 October 1989. Viking were in their 8th final (3 wins and 4 runners-up), while Molde were in their second final after losing the 1982 final against Brann and therefore had the chance to win the first trophy in the club's history. 

The first final between the two teams ended with a 2–2 draw. A replay was played on the following Sunday on 29 October and ended with a 2–1 win for Viking who became Norwegian Champions for the fourth time.

Route to the final

(D1) = 1. divisjon team
(D2) = 2. divisjon team
(D3) = 3. divisjon team

Matches

First match details

Replay match details

See also
1989 Norwegian Football Cup
1989 1. divisjon
1989 2. divisjon
1989 in Norwegian football

References

External links 
 Cup final at rsssf.no

1989
Molde FK matches
Viking FK matches
Football Cup
Sports competitions in Oslo
1980s in Oslo
October 1989 sports events in Europe